Melting the Crown is the eighteenth studio album by American rapper Z-Ro. It was released on February 24, 2015 through One Deep Entertainment and J. Prince Entertainment. Recording sessions took place at The Cold Chamber Studios and at Hoover Sound Studio in Houston. The album features guest appearances from Kirko Bangz, Lil' Keke, Mike D and Rick Ross.

Track listing

Personnel
Joseph Wayne McVey IV – primary artist
William Leonard Roberts II – featured artist (track 2)
Marcus Lakee Edwards – featured artist (track 7)
Michael Dixon – featured artist (track 9)
Kirk Jerel Randle – featured artist (track 12)
Mickaël Zibi – additional vocals (track 13), mixing (tracks: 1-6, 8-9, 11-14), recording (tracks: 1, 3-6, 9, 11-13), artwork, design, photography
Jonathan Zibi – guitar (track 5), producer (tracks: 1, 3, 6, 9, 13)
Donald Johnson, Jr. – producer (tracks: 2, 11, 12)
Kenneth Roy – producer (tracks: 2, 11, 12)
Sean Jemison – producer (tracks: 4, 7)
Roderick Tillman – producer (track 5)
Flaco The Great – producer (track 8)
Cory Moore – producer & mixing (track 10)
Leroy Williams, Jr. – producer (track 14)
James Hoover – mixing (track 7), recording (tracks: 2, 7)
Nick Rush – mastering

Charts

References

2015 albums
Z-Ro albums
Rap-A-Lot Records albums